The Journal of Housing Economics is a quarterly peer-reviewed academic journal covering housing economics. It was established in 1991 and is published by Elsevier. The editors-in-chief are Paul E. Carrillo (George Washington University), and Henry Pollakowski (Harvard University), and it is co-edited by Daniel Hartley (Federal Reserve Bank of Chicago) and Jeffrey Zabel (Tufts University). According to the Journal Citation Reports, the journal has a 2020 impact factor of 1.705.

References

External links

Economics journals
Quarterly journals
Publications established in 1991
Elsevier academic journals
English-language journals